PJW may refer to:
Punjab Warriors, hockey team from Punjab, India
 Paul Joseph Watson (born 1982), English YouTube personality
Peter J. Weinberger (born 1942), American computer scientist